Krista Brodie  is a Canadian Armed Forces officer serving as a brigadier general in the Canadian Army. She is currently serving as the Public Health Agency of Canada's (PHAC) vice president of logistics and operations leading the federal government's COVID-19 vaccination distribution program.

Military career 
Brodie holds degrees in Military Strategic Studies, Defence Studies, National Resource Strategy and a certificate in Global Supply Chain Management. She has been the quartermaster of the Third Battalion, Princess Patricia’s Canadian Light Infantry, and was the first woman to command 1 Service Battalion, the largest unit in the Canadian Field Force. She participated in an exchange with the 75th Ranger Battalion. Brodie went to Washington DC, where she was on the faculty of the Strategic Leadership Department at the Eisenhower School of National Security and Resource Strategy, National Defence University. 

In 2013, then Colonel Brodie, was named to the WXN Canada’s Most Powerful Women: Top 100 list.

In February 2020, Brodie served briefly as the Commander of Military Personnel Generation Group.

Public Health Agency of Canada secondment and onwards 
Brodie was appointed to the position of Vice President Logistics and Operations with the Public Health Agency of Canada (PHAC) on May 17, 2021, succeeding Major General Dany Fortin, who fell under investigation. Brodie had worked in the program with Fortin at its inception in November 2020, before becoming the commander of the Military Personnel Generation Group in February 2021.

By September 2021, the position was abolished. and Brodie returned to her normal duties. , Brodie was in charge of recruitment and training for the CAF.

Awards and decorations
Brodie's personal awards and decorations include the following:

27px100px

File:CD-ribbon and 2 bars.png

 She also wears the Canadian Forces Jump Wings With White Maple Leaf.

References 

Living people
Canadian generals
1970 births